Isocitric acid is a structural isomer of citric acid. Since citric acid and isocitric acid are structural isomers, they share similar physical and chemical properties. Due to these similar properties, it is difficult to separate the isomers. Salts and esters of isocitric acid are known as isocitrates. The isocitrate anion is a substrate of the citric acid cycle. Isocitrate is formed from citrate with the help of the enzyme aconitase, and is acted upon by isocitrate dehydrogenase.

Isocitric acid is commonly used as a marker to detect the authenticity and quality of fruit products, most often citrus juices.  In authentic orange juice, for example, the ratio of citric acid to D-isocitric acid is usually less than 130. An isocitric acid value higher than this may be indicative of fruit juice adulteration.

Isocitric acid has largely been used as a biochemical agent due to limited amounts. However, isocitric acid has been shown to have pharmaceutical and therapeutic effects. Isocitric acid has been shown to effectively treat iron deficient anemia. Additionally, isocitric acid could be used to treat Parkinson's disease. Yarrowia lipolytica can be used to produce isocitric acid and is inexpensive compared to other methods. Furthermore, other methods produce unequal amounts of citric acid to isocitric acid ratio, mostly producing citric acid. Use of Yarrowia lipolytica produces a better yield, making equal amounts of citric acid to isocitric acid.

Interactive pathway map

See also 

 Citric Acid
 Tartaric Acid
 Malic Acid

References

Alpha hydroxy acids
Tricarboxylic acids
Citric acid cycle compounds
Aldols